The Man Who Loved Women is a 1977 French comedy/drama film directed by François Truffaut and starring Charles Denner, Brigitte Fossey and Nelly Borgeaud. In 1983, an American remake of the same name starring Burt Reynolds and Julie Andrews was produced by Hollywood. The film had a total of 955,262 admissions in France.

Plot
Montpellier: December 1976. At the funeral of Bertrand Morane,  Genevieve (Fossey) observes the other mourners, all women once involved with him. The following is told in flashback.

Morane (Denner), a man in early middle-age, works in a laboratory testing the aerodynamics of aircraft, and pursues women in a compulsive, but casual manner without showing any signs of a capacity for commitment. He goes to extraordinary lengths to locate a woman he had seen, only to discover she was briefly visiting France and lives in Montreal. Bertrand becomes friendly with Hélène (Fontanel), who runs a lingerie shop, but she confesses to being attracted to younger men; she is forty-one, and does not become involved with men older than thirty. He has an affair with Delphine (Borgeaud), the wife of a doctor, who gains arousal from the threat of discovery, but she is imprisoned for the attempted murder of her husband. He recollects his childhood and his relationship with his distant mother, remembering her legs in shots reminiscent of the frequent leg shots of women in the film. He pretends to have a child in need of baby sitting in order to lure a young woman to his apartment. When she discovers the doll he has put in his bed in place of a baby and asks him what this is, he replies, "It's me". After a number of very casual encounters, Bertrand contracts gonorrhea, discovered at a very early stage, but is unable to recollect the names of the six women he has slept with in the previous twelve days.

Eventually, he begins his autobiography only for his typist to find the content too much to continue. Completed, it is submitted to the four leading publishers in Paris. A member of the editorial staff at one of them, Genevieve, stands up for the work against the objections of her (male) colleagues. Rejecting his title for the book, she suggests The Man Who Loved Women, which he finds ideal. Bertrand meets Véra (Caron), a significant old flame, while the book is at the proof stage, and insists on withdrawing the book from publication because he had neglected to mention her. Genevieve though persuades him to make Véra the subject of his second book; he needs to like himself she says. By now, Genevieve has fallen in love with him, in spite of recognizing his personality flaws, but he is hit by a car while rushing to follow two women with attractive legs. Admitted to the hospital and forbidden to move, he sees nurses in his doorway and, attracted by their legs, accidentally severs his drip, falls out of his bed, and dies.

At the funeral, Genevieve speculates on the other women's relationship with Bertrand, she does not speak to them, and reflects that it is only herself who knows the ending.

Cast
 Charles Denner - Bertrand Morane
 Brigitte Fossey - Geneviève Bigey
 Nelly Borgeaud - Delphine Grezel
 Geneviève Fontanel - Hélène
 Leslie Caron - Véra
 Nathalie Baye - Martine Desdoits / "Aurore" (uncredited French voice only)
 Valérie Bonnier - Fabienne
 Jean Dasté - Docteur Bicard
 Roger Leenhardt - The Publisher
 François Truffaut - Man at Funeral (uncredited)

Production
Truffaut used his free time during the filming of Close Encounters of the Third Kind to write the script.

Reception
At the time of the film's release, Vincent Canby described it as a "supremely humane, sophisticated comedy that is as much fun to watch for the variations Mr. Truffaut works on classic man-woman routines as for the routines themselves" and observed "I suppose there's always been a little of the late Ernst Lubitsch in all Truffaut comedies, ...but there is more than I've ever seen before in The Man Who Loved Women." Canby wrote: "Denner is very, very funny as Bertrand, a fellow who has the same single-minded purpose as the rat exterminator he played in Such a Gorgeous Kid Like Me, as well as the delicacy of touch of Antoine Doinel on his best behavior" and called the sequence featuring Leslie Caron the film's "most marvelous, most surprising"; her scene of four or five minutes is "so remarkably well played and written that an entire love affair, from the beginning to the middle and the end, is movingly evoked through what is really just exposition."

For Ronald Bergan and Robyn Karney in the Bloomsbury Foreign Film Guide, "the film obstinately refuses to cast light on its characters, making it no more than a superficial and sporadically entertaining exercise." Geoff Andrew in the Time Out Film Guide describes the film as "[c]harmless...[it] irritates by its over-wrought sense of literary-style paradox, [and] by its insistence on eccentricity as its source of humour". Melissa E. Biggs though, in French Films 1945-1993, describes it as "an extraordinary film ... made at just the right moment in time, when sexual obsession could still be ironic and celebrated and not held up to scorn by political correctness and feminist righteousness".

The film was entered into the 27th Berlin International Film Festival. In the United States, it was nominated for Best Foreign Language Film by the U.S. National Board of Review.

References

External links
 

1977 films
1977 romantic comedy films
1970s French-language films
Films directed by François Truffaut
Films partially in color
French sex comedy films
Films with screenplays by François Truffaut
United Artists films
1970s sex comedy films
1970s French films